Efraim Amira is a former Israeli footballer who is most famous for being a major part in the success of Maccabi Netanya in the 1970s.

Honours
Israeli Premier League (3):
1970-71, 1973-74, 1977-78
State Cup (1):
1978
Israeli Supercup (3):
1971, 1974, 1978
UEFA Intertoto Cup (1):
1978

References

Living people
Israeli footballers
Maccabi Netanya F.C. players
Hapoel Netanya F.C. players
Liga Leumit players
Association football midfielders
Year of birth missing (living people)